Václav Renč (28 November 1911, Vodochody – 30 April 1973, Brno) was a Czech poet, dramatist and translator. Like other Catholic ruralistic writers, his themes included God, traditions and the countryside.

Life
Renč was born in Vodochody. He graduated from the College of Philosophy of Charles University in Prague in 1936. He edited the journal Rozhledy po literatuře (i.e. "Views over literature") together with František Halas (between 1933 and 1936). Then he worked as an editor at several journals (Akord, Obnova and Řád), later as a publishing editor. He was also a dramaturgist in Olomouc theatre (1945–1948) and in Zemské divadlo theatre in Brno in 1947.

After the 1948 communist coup in Czechoslovakia he and other catholic writers were hated by the regime. In 1951, Renč was arrested and in 1952 he was sentenced to 25 years in prison without any evidence. He was released in 1962, rehabilitated in 1968. He became dramaturg operetta dramaturgist in Olomouc in 1969. He died, aged 61, in Brno.

Works
 Jitření, 1933
 Studánky, 1935
 Sedmihradská zem, 1937
 Vinný lis, 1938
 Trojzpěvy, 1940
 Marnotratný syn, 1942
 Císařův mim, 1944
 Barbora Celská, 1948 drama
 Tom Sawyer od řeky Mississippi, 1964, stage play for children based on novel by Mark Twain.
 Královské vraždění: Polonius, tragická komedie o pěti dějstvích, 1967
 Hoře z návratu: Dramatická báseň o dvou dílech, 1969
 Popelka Nazaretská, 1969
 Setkání s Minotaurem, 1969 lyrical poems written in years 1963 – 1967
 Skřivaní věž, 1970 poems written in prison
 Pražská legenda, 1974
 Sluncem oděná, 1979
 České žalmy, 1989
 Perníková chaloupka, 1990
 Kůzlátka a hloupý vlk, 1992 fairy tales
 Loretánské světlo, 1992
 Podoben větru, 1994 summary of poetry
 S anděly si nelze připíjet, 2000
 Vrstvení achátu, 2000

Aside his own work he has also translated from German, English, French, Italian and Polish.

See also

List of Czech writers

References

Czech children's writers
Czech translators
Czech male poets
Czech male dramatists and playwrights
1911 births
1973 deaths
People from Litoměřice District
Czechoslovak Socialist Republic rehabilitations
Czechoslovak prisoners and detainees
Prisoners and detainees of Czechoslovakia
Recipients of the Order of Tomáš Garrigue Masaryk
20th-century translators
20th-century Czech poets
20th-century Czech dramatists and playwrights